Who's Afraid of Virginia Woolf? is a 1964 studio album by organist Jimmy Smith, released on the Verve label. Smith is accompanied by a big band with arrangements by Oliver Nelson and Claus Ogerman.

Reception
AllMusic reviewer Michael G. Nastos, only gave the album 2½ stars stating that:

The album was however, Smith's third highest charting album, spending 31 weeks and charting as high as number 16 on the US Billboard 200 charts.

Track listing
 "Slaughter on Tenth Avenue" (Richard Rodgers) – 7:06
 "Who's Afraid of Virginia Woolf?, Pt. 1" (Don Kirkpatrick, Keith Knox) – 4:29
 "Who's Afraid of Virginia Woolf?, Pt. 2" (Kirkpatrick, Knox) – 5:00
 "John Brown's Body" (Traditional) – 5:18
 "Wives and Lovers" (Burt Bacharach, Hal David) – 3:17
 "Women of the World" (Riziero Ortolani) – 5:47
 "Bluesette" (Toots Thielemans) – 3:40

Recorded on January 20 (#1), 21 (#2-3) and January 27 (#4-7), 1964.

Personnel

Musicians
 Jimmy Smith – organ
 Oliver Nelson – arranger (#1-3)
 Claus Ogerman – arranger, conductor

Technical
 Creed Taylor – producer
 Val Valentin – engineer
 Rudy Van Gelder – engineer
 Acy Lehman – design
 Roy De Carava – photography
 Daddio Daylie – liner notes

Chart performance

Album

Single

References

1964 albums
Jimmy Smith (musician) albums
Albums arranged by Claus Ogerman
Albums arranged by Oliver Nelson
Verve Records albums